Onakkoor  is a village in Ernakulam district in the Indian state of Kerala. The main attractions in the village are Onakkoor River and Onakkoor Temple. Other attractions include Edayan Lake and Onakkoor check dam (Ooranattu chera). Famous writer George Onakkoor is associated with this village. The SH-42 Highway passes through Onakkoor. Piravom is the nearest town with markets and hospitals. The dominant religions are Hinduism and Christianity.

Onakkoor is a part of Pambakuda Grama Panchayat (പാമ്പാക്കുട ഗ്രാമ പഞ്ചായത്ത്) and is situated in Muvattupuzha Taluk.

Worship Places

Hinduism 
 Onakkoor temple (Onakkoor devi temple)
 Kalarickal temple (Kalarickal paradevatha temple)
 Shasthankal temple (Puthen Sabarimala sree dharmashasthaa temple)
 Pandianpara temple (Pandianpara bhadrakali temple)

Christianity 
 Onakkoor Valiyapally-St Marys Orthodox church - Located at onakkoor Pallippady(First church of Onakkoor)
 Onakkoor Sehiyon Orthodox Syrian church  - located near Onakkoor Palam junction. 
 St. Mary's Malankara Catholic Church near Onakkoor Pandiyan Para Temple.
 St. George Orthodox Chapel

Transportation
 Bus Terminal (Private & Public) is available at around 5 km away at Piravom. 
 Nearest railway station is Piravom Road railway station, at Velloor. 
 Nearest airport is Cochin International Airport at Nedumbaserry

Demographics
 India census, Onakkoor had a population of 12,421 with 6,203 males and 6,218 females.

References

Villages in Ernakulam district